Choi In-hyuk (born 23 February 1994) is a South Korean judoka.

He participated at the 2018 World Judo Championships, winning a medal.

References

External links
 

1994 births
Living people
South Korean male judoka
21st-century South Korean people